Savita Gupta is the former mayor of South Delhi Municipal Corporation. She is three time councillor from Amar Colony. She is a member of Bharatiya Janata Party and hails from Jammu.

References

Mayors of South Delhi
Bharatiya Janata Party politicians from Delhi
Living people
Women mayors of places in Delhi
People from Jammu (city)
Year of birth missing (living people)
21st-century Indian women politicians
21st-century Indian politicians